"Business Trip" is the eighth episode of the fifth season of the television series The Office, and the show's eightieth episode overall. The episode aired in the United States on November 13, 2008, on NBC.

In this episode, Michael, Oscar and Andy are sent to Winnipeg, Manitoba on a business trip, where Michael has trouble understanding the actual purpose of the concierge and Andy and Oscar bond. Meanwhile, Jim and the rest of the office eagerly wait for Pam's return from art school.

Synopsis
CFO David Wallace (Andy Buckley) sends Michael Scott (Steve Carell) on a sales call to Winnipeg to alleviate the stress of having Holly Flax relocated. Michael brings Andy Bernard (Ed Helms) and Oscar Martinez (Oscar Nunez). David suggests Michael go to the concierge to find activities to do in the city. Michael is attracted to the concierge, Marie (Wendi McLendon-Covey), believing a concierge is the Winnipeg version of a Geisha. Michael and Marie have a few drinks and spend the night in her hotel room.

Andy reveals to Oscar that he and Angela Martin (Angela Kinsey) have not had sex. Oscar tells Andy to call Angela. Andy calls Angela, who is with Dwight Schrute (Rainn Wilson), though Andy does not notice, and tells her he does not like that they have not had sex. Angela berates him for calling her while drunk and hangs up on him.

The next morning, Oscar brings up Andy's call to Angela, and a sobered-up Andy exclaims that he thought that was a dream. Andy calls Angela to apologize, saying afterward that Angela has put them back on "first base", meaning Andy gets to kiss her forehead. Despite this, Andy is glad he had the chance to bond with Oscar. Michael secures the sale with the client and calls David, who congratulates him. Michael then tells David he had a terrible time in Winnipeg and berates him for taking Holly away from him before hanging up. He gets on the plane to Scranton, mentioning he stays with the company because they respect him enough that he can talk down to his boss without being fired.

Pam Beesly (Jenna Fischer) fails an art school class and calls Jim Halpert (John Krasinski) to tell him she needs to stay in New York to retake it. Pam is unsure whether she wants to spend another three months away, but Jim reminds her that she went to New York for her benefit and should return to Scranton "the right way". After work, Jim finds Pam in the parking lot. Pam tells Jim she is returning "the wrong way" because she did not like graphic design and Scranton is her home.

Ryan Howard (B. J. Novak) moves back to the annex with Kelly Kapoor (Mindy Kaling) and shows off by doing push ups. Kelly says she has no intention of breaking up with Darryl Philbin (Craig Robinson) before the two kiss. Kelly breaks up with Darryl via text message, and Darryl responds saying "it's cool." Ryan and Kelly confirm they are back together, with Ryan visibly uncomfortable while Darryl happily walks back to his truck.

Production
Writer Brent Forrester selected Winnipeg, saying "Winnipeg seemed to strike the right balance between exotic and obscure."

As the episode was filmed in Los Angeles, the Winnipeg tourism promotion agency sent local paraphernalia including airport baggage tags and items from distinctive local businesses such as The Bay, Old Dutch potato chips, and Fort Garry brewing company.

References

External links
"Business Trip" at NBC.com

The Office (American season 5) episodes
2008 American television episodes
Manitoba in fiction